"Lonesome Street" is a song by English rock band Blur. It was released on 2 April 2015 as the third single from their eighth studio album, The Magic Whip (2015). "Lonesome Street" was released to American radio on 30 March 2015.

Track listing

Personnel
Damon Albarn - lead vocals
Graham Coxon - co-lead vocals, guitar
Alex James - bass guitar
Dave Rowntree - drums
Stephen Street - arpeggiated synthesizers, percussion programming

References

2015 singles
2015 songs
Blur (band) songs
Song recordings produced by Stephen Street
Songs written by Alex James (musician)
Songs written by Damon Albarn
Songs written by Dave Rowntree
Songs written by Graham Coxon